This article ranks states of the United States sorted by changes in the life expectancy of their residents between 1985 and 2010.  Changes in the life expectancy of men and women in each state are also sorted.  States are also ranked for three risk factors controllable by the individual: obesity, smoking, and physical activity.

The data is taken from the Institute for Health Metrics and Evaluation, an independent global health research center at the University of Washington.

Note: May not add to total due to rounding.

Life expectancy (years)

Note: may not add to total due to rounding

Controllable risk factors
This list ranks U.S. states for three factors, controllable by the individual: obesity, smoking, and physical activity. These factors affect longevity: obesity and smoking reduce longevity and a higher level of physical activity increases longevity.

See also
 List of U.S. states and territories by life expectancy
 List of U.S. counties with shortest life expectancy
 List of U.S. counties with longest life expectancy

References

Life expectancy changes,1985
State life expectancy changes,1985
Life expectancy changes,1985
Lists of people-related superlatives
United States